Marcie Michelle Free (born Mark Edward Free on April 12, 1954) is an American rock singer, best known as the lead singer of King Kobra, Signal and Unruly Child.

History
Free started singing professionally at the age of 19 while living in Flint, Michigan (1973). In 1975, Free moved to Las Vegas, Nevada which eventually (in 1979) led to her relocating to Los Angeles, CA where she met Carmine Appice (Vanilla Fudge, Beck, Bogert & Appice, Rod Stewart) in 1983.  Together they formed King Kobra and were signed to Capitol Records in 1984. Free recorded two albums with King Kobra, Ready to Strike and Thrill of a Lifetime, before leaving in November 1986 to pursue other musical interests.

In 1987, Free formed a band with guitarist Danny Jacob, bassist and keyboardist Erik Scott and drummer Jan Uvena, which would later take the name Signal. Signal recorded one album for EMI, 1989's Loud and Clear, before disbanding soon after.

In 1990, Free then joined up with Bruce Gowdy, (Stone Fury/World Trade) and Guy Allison (World Trade) (keyboards), forming a group known as Unruly Child. Unruly Child signed with Atlantic/Interscope Records in 1991 and released their self-titled debut album in 1992. In 1993, Free sang the theme song, "(To Be) The Best of the Best", for the action film, Best of the Best II. Also in 1993, a solo album consisting of demos Free had sung for a mother/daughter songwriting duo named Judithe and Robin Randall was released on an independent label in the UK called Now & Then Records. The album entitled Long Way from Love was re-released on Frontiers Records in 1998.  This album version included some of the live performances Free gave while in Manchester, England for the first rock festival known as "The Gods of AOR" in October 1993.

Shortly after the release of Long Way from Love, Unruly Child, after losing their record deal with Atlantic/Interscope, had reformed under the moniker Twelve Pound Sledge and were writing new material in hopes of re-signing with another U.S. label. That never happened, though songs from these sessions were later released in 1995, as a solo album on independent labels in Germany and Japan, entitled Tormented.

Suffering with gender dysphoria all her life, Free came out to the world as Marcie Free in November 1993. In 1995, Free retired from the music business and moved back to Michigan to be close to her family. However, she still sings professionally on the side and in September 2009, Free, Gowdy and Allison reunited as Unruly Child and signed a recording contract with Frontiers Records. A new album with that label, Worlds Collide, has been released to critical acclaim. Unruly Child's triad (Free, Gowdy, Allison) continues to write and record. They released a new album in 2014 entitled Down the Rabbit Hole on the band's own label "Unruly Records".

Discography

Studio albums
Long Way from Love (1993)

with King Kobra
 Ready to Strike (1985)
 Thrill of a Lifetime (1986)

with Signal
 Loud & Clear (1989)
 Signal Live (2000)

with Unruly Child
 Unruly Child (1992)
 Tormented (1995) as Marcie Free
 Worlds Collide (2010)
 Down the Rabbit Hole (2014)
 Can't Go Home (2017)
 Big Blue World (2019)
 Our Glass House (2020)

Guest appearances
 David Cassidy – David Cassidy (1990)
 Desmond Child – Discipline (1991)
 Julio Iglesias – Crazy (1994)
 Bobby Kimball – Rise Up (1994)
 Venus & Mars – New Moon Rising (1998)
 Venus & Mars – Grand Trine (2009)

References

1954 births
Living people
Musicians from South Bend, Indiana
American heavy metal singers
LGBT people from Indiana
American LGBT singers
Transgender women musicians
King Kobra members
American women heavy metal singers
Transgender singers